Marquis Édouard Marie René Bardon de Segonzac (7 September 1867 – 27 March 1962) was a French army officer and explorer. He studied at the École Spéciale Militaire de Saint-Cyr before being commissioned and serving in the Ivory Coast where he was accused and acquitted of the murder of a fellow officer in the notorious Quiquerez-Segonzac affair(fr). He became renowned as an explorer and adventurer in Morocco and was also posted to Tunisia. In the First World War, he became a pilot and received the Legion of Honour and the Croix de Guerre.

Early life 
Édouard Marie René Bardon de Segonzac was born in the Château des Essarts in Cuy, Oise on 7 September 1867.  His parents were Édouard and Mathilde des Rioul de Segonzac. He entered military service in 1886, studying at the École Spéciale Militaire de Saint-Cyr and being in the first class to graduate from the Châlons-en-Champagne campus in 1889. Upon receiving his commission he joined the cavalry and served in the occupation of San Pédro on the Ivory Coast in 1892. In October 1893, he was tried for the murder of Lieutenant Paul Quiquerez(fr) but was acquitted of all charges against him. Sometime thereafter de Segonzac returned to France before leaving from Marseille in November 1904 to serve in the winter campaign in Morocco.

First World War
During the First World War, de Segonzac served as a captain in the French military aviation corps. During the war he listed his address as Rue Dumont D'urville in Paris and in 1915 was posted to Chartres for a while. He was married and his wife, the Comtesse de Segonzac, resided in Compiegne.  He remained a member of the Vieilles Tiges pilots association after the war. De Segonzac received the Legion of Honour and the Croix de Guerre during his military career and held several foreign decorations. He also held campaign medals for Tunisia and Morocco.

Later life 
De Segonzac became renowned as an explorer and adventurer and may have served as the inspiration for Lieutenant André de Saint-Avit in Pierre Benoit's Atlantida, in which one French officer murders another. He was also a writer publishing several books such as Voyages au Maroc (1899-1901) (Voyages in Morocco) in 1903 and La Légende de Florinda la Byzantine (The legend of Florinda the Byzantine) in 1928, the latter illustrated by H. Zworykine and with a preface written by Marshal Hubert Lyautey.

References 

1867 births
1962 deaths
French Army officers
French military personnel of World War I
People from Oise
Recipients of the Legion of Honour
Recipients of the Croix de Guerre 1914–1918 (France)